Mormidea lugens is a species of stink bug in the family Pentatomidae found in the Caribbean, Central America, and Eastern North America. In Illinois, adults have been observed emerging from overwintering sites in late April, and continue to be observed until early November, and appear to be bivoltine in this area. Mormidea lugens has been documented to feed on timothy, sedges (including Carex shortiana, C. amphibola, C. normalis), as well as deer-tongue grass (Panicum clandestinum), and Bosc's panic-grass (P. boscii). It has been collected from pale sedge (C. blanda) and wide-leaved spiderwort (Tradescantia subaspera) but has not observed feeding on these species, and deer-tongue grass appears to be an insufficient food source for development.

References

Further reading

External links

 

Insects described in 1775
Taxa named by Johan Christian Fabricius
Pentatomini